Tom and Huck is a 1995 American adventure comedy-drama film based on Mark Twain's 1876 novel The Adventures of Tom Sawyer, and starring Jonathan Taylor Thomas, Brad Renfro, Mike McShane, Eric Schweig and Amy Wright. The film was directed by Peter Hewitt and produced/co-written by Stephen Sommers (who also worked on Disney's adaptation of Twain's 1884 novel, 1993's The Adventures of Huck Finn). The movie was released in North America on December 22, 1995.

In the film, mischievous young Tom Sawyer witnesses a murder by a vicious half-Native American criminal known as "Injun Joe". Tom befriends Huck Finn, a boy with no future and no family, and is forced to choose between honoring a friendship or honoring an oath, when the town drunk is accused of the murder.

Plot
One dark stormy night, Injun Joe goes to meet Doctor Jonas Robinson for some shady business. Meanwhile, a young boy name Tom Sawyer runs away from home with his friends to become steamboat men. This ultimately fails as their raft collides on a rock in the Mississippi River, throwing Tom into the water. His friends find him washed up on the shore, and Tom finds it was Huck Finn who carried him to safety. Tom later meets Huck discovering an unusual way to remove warts - by taking a dead cat to the graveyard at night. There they witness Injun Joe and Muff Potter, the town drunk, digging up the grave of Vic "One-Eyed" Murrell for Doctor Robinson. A treasure map is discovered and Doc assaults Muff and Injun Joe in an attempt to take it for himself. Doc manages to knock out Muff, but Injun Joe fights back by fatally stabbing Doc with Muff's knife.

The next morning, Muff is charged for the murder. Tom and Huck had signed an oath saying that if either of them came forward about it, they would drop dead and rot. The boys embark on a search for the treasure map Injun Joe has, so they can declare Muff innocent while preserving their oath. Eventually however, Joe finds the lost treasure and asks his partner to hide the treasure in a cave before burning the map. With the only evidence to prove Muff's innocence destroyed, Tom and Huck's friendship starts to decline, and Huck eventually leaves Hannibal. Joe then discovers that Tom was a witness to the crime. He finds Tom and threatens he will kill him if he ever tells anyone about the murder. 

At Muff Potter's trial, Tom decides that his friendship with Muff is more important than his oath with Huck and exposes the truth. Injun Joe in fury, unsuccessfully attempts to kill Tom before leaving Hannibal. The townspeople declare Tom as a hero for his bravery and plans to throw a festival to commemorate the occasion. Tom, however, knowing Joe is after him, refuses to attend. Huck later sneaks into Tom's bedroom one night, criticizing Tom for breaking their oath before leaving town again.

The next day during the festival, a group of children, including Tom and his love interest Becky Thatcher, enter the caves, where Tom and Becky become lost. Meanwhile, the judge is alerted by the sheriff that Joe ended up killing one of his partners. Huck, who secretly attends the festival, overhears all this and goes after Tom. They eventually stumble upon Injun Joe in McDougal's Cave. He traps them, but Tom and Becky manage to escape. Tom later discovers the spot where Joe hid his treasure. He then finds an opening in the cave and asks Becky to get her father.

Injun Joe ultimately finds Tom and attempts to kill him before Huck suddenly shows up. After a brief struggle, Injun Joe easily overpowers Huck. Just as Joe is about land a finishing blow, Tom quietly empties the contents from the treasure chest and threatens Joe by throwing the treasure chest over a chasm. Injun Joe then tries to get the chest from Tom, only to fall into the chasm to his death. The boys reconcile as they claim Joe's treasure and are declared heroes by the people. Tom is praised on the front page of the newspaper, and Widow Douglas adopts Huck Finn.

Cast
Jonathan Taylor Thomas as Thomas "Tom" Sawyer
Brad Renfro as Huckleberry "Huck" Finn
Eric Schweig as Injun Joe
Charles Rocket as Judge Thatcher: Becky's father
Amy Wright as Aunt Polly: Tom's maternal aunt
Mike McShane as Muff Potter
Marian Seldes as Widow Douglas: Huck's adoptive mother
Rachael Leigh Cook as Rebecca "Becky" Thatcher: Tom's love interest
Courtland Mead as Sid Sawyer: Tom's younger brother
Joey Stinson as Joseph "Joe" Harper 
Blake Heron as Benjamin "Ben" Rodgers
Lanny Flaherty as Emmett: Injun Joe's accomplice.
Peter MacKenzie as Mr. Sneed
Heath Lamberts as Mr. Dobbins
William Newman as Doctor Jonas Robinson
Andy Stahl as Sheriff
Bronwen Murray as Cousin Mary: Tom's maternal cousin

Reception

Box office
In its opening weekend, the film grossed $3,210,458 million in 1,609 theaters in the United States and Canada, debuting number 9 of box office. In its second week it rose to No. 8 grossed 	$6,789,871 million. The U.S. and Canada box office for Tom and Huck was $23,920,048.

Critical
The film received mixed to negative reviews, with a 'rotten' 25% on review aggregate Rotten Tomatoes.

Accolades

Home media
The film was released on VHS and LaserDisc on May 1, 1996, in DVD on May 6, 2003, on February 10, 2009 was released double feature with The Adventures of Huck Finn (1993) and also in Blu-Ray on July 13, 2021.  It is also included on Disney's streaming service, Disney+.

See also
The Adventures of Huck Finn (1993) - Disney's previous Twain adaptation, also worked on by Sommers, and starring Elijah Wood, Courtney B. Vance and Jason Robards.

References

External links
 

1995 comedy-drama films
1990s adventure comedy-drama films
1990s American films
1990s buddy comedy-drama films
1990s coming-of-age comedy-drama films
1990s English-language films
1990s teen comedy-drama films
American adventure comedy-drama films
American coming-of-age comedy-drama films
American teen comedy-drama films
Films about orphans
Films about runaways
Films based on American novels
Films based on The Adventures of Tom Sawyer
Films directed by Peter Hewitt
Films produced by Laurence Mark
Films set in the 19th century
Films with screenplays by David Loughery
Walt Disney Pictures films